is a junction passenger railway station located in the city of Akō, Hyōgo Prefecture, Japan, operated by the West Japan Railway Company (JR West).

Lines
Banshū-Akō Station is a terminus of the Akō Line, forming the western terminus for trains from Himeji and JR Kobe Line, and the eastern terminus for trains bound for Okayama Station.

Station layout
The station consists of a ground-level side platform and a ground-level island platform connected by an elevated station building. The station has a Midori no Madoguchi staffed ticket office.

Platforms

Adjacent stations

|-
!colspan=5|JR West

History
Banshū-Akō Station was opened on December 12, 1951. With the privatization of the Japan National Railways (JNR) on April 1, 1987, the station came under the aegis of the West Japan Railway Company.

Passenger statistics
In fiscal 2019, the station was used by an average of 4080 passengers daily

Surrounding area
 Akō City Hall 
Akō Castle Ruins
 Akō City Museum of History 
 Akō City Folk Museum 
Japan National Route 250

See also
List of railway stations in Japan

References

External links

 JR West - Banshū-Akō Station

Railway stations in Hyōgo Prefecture
Stations of West Japan Railway Company
Railway stations in Japan opened in 1951
Akō, Hyōgo